Richard McKnight (born in Scotland), is a former Scottish rugby union player, formerly of Glasgow Warriors. McKnight played at Scrum-Half.

Amateur career

McKnight played for Glasgow Academicals, Glasgow Southern and Glasgow Hawks.

He returned to Academicals in 2008 and captained the side.

Professional career

He was with the Warriors in season 2003-04.

He was with the Warriors in season 2004-05.

References

External links
Aberdeen 37 Hawks 21: Aberdeen prey on Hawks
Glasgow wary of Munster backlash
SCRUM HALF RICHARD McKNIGHT BREAKS THROUGH THE HERIOTS TACKLERS
BT Scotland Premiership Round-Up
Title finally belongs to Glasgow

1977 births
Living people
Scottish rugby union players
Glasgow Warriors players
Glasgow Hawks players
Glasgow Academicals rugby union players
Glasgow Southern players
Rugby union players from Glasgow
Rugby union scrum-halves